Levski Sofia is a Bulgarian sports club based in Sofia. It was founded in 1911. The club is named after Vasil Levski, the national hero of Bulgaria.

The club develops 30 types of sports. Its football team, PFC Levski Sofia, is its most popular section. Other important sections are BC Levski Sofia, the basketball team, and VC Levski Sofia, the volleyball team. Levski is the only Bulgarian club, and one of the few in Europe, to have won the European Champions' Cup in three different team sports – basketball, volleyball and athletics. 

To date, Levski has reached 26 European Finals in total (won nine titles) – one EuroLeague, one CEV Champions League, two European Champion Clubs Cup (athletics) titles, two EuroCup titles, and three Balkan League titles; and was runner-up in (17 finals) – three CEV Champions League Finals, two European Champion Clubs Cup (athletics) Finals, six CEV Cup Winners' Cup Finals, one EuroCup Final, two Balkan League Finals, two Balkans Cup Finals, and one Intertoto Cup Ernst Thommen Final. The athletes of Levski have won almost 1,000 medals from Olympic Games, World Championships and European Championships, which makes Levski one of the most successful European sports clubs of all-time.

Football

Bulgarian A Group : 26

 1933, 1937, 1942, 1946, 1947, 1949, 1950, 1953, 1965, 1968, 1970, 1974, 1977, 1979, 1984, 1985, 1988, 1993, 1994, 1995, 2000, 2001, 2002, 2006, 2007, 2009

Bulgarian Cup : 26

 1942, 1946, 1947, 1949, 1950, 1956, 1957, 1959, 1967, 1970, 1971, 1976, 1977, 1979, 1984, 1986, 1991, 1992, 1994, 1998, 2000, 2002, 2003, 2005, 2007, 2022

Sofia Championship : 11

 1923, 1924, 1925, 1929, 1933, 1937, 1942, 1943, 1945, 1946, 1948

Tsar's Cup / Cup of the Soviet Army / Cup of Bulgaria : 6

 1933, 1937, 1982, 1984, 1987, 1988

Ulpia Serdika Cup : 4

 1926, 1930, 1931, 1932

Bulgarian Supercup : 3

 2005, 2007, 2009

 Double : 13

 1942, 1946, 1947, 1949, 1950, 1970, 1977, 1979, 1984, 1994, 2000, 2002, 2007

 Treble : 4

 1942, 1946, 1984, 2007

 UEFA Europa League, UEFA Cup Winners' Cup 1/4 Finals : 1969–70, 1975–76, 1976–77, 1986–87, 2005–06

UCL, UEL Group Stage : 2005–06, 2006–07, 2009–10, 2010–11

Balkans Cup Runners-Up : 1960–61, 1961–63

Intertoto Cup Ernst Thommen Runners-Up : 1981

Basketball

Men

National Basketball League : 16

 1942, 1945, 1946, 1947, 1978, 1979, 1981, 1982, 1986, 1993, 1994, 2000, 2001, 2014, 2018, 2021

Bulgarian Cup : 15

 1969, 1971, 1972, 1976, 1979, 1980, 1982, 1983, 1993, 2001, 2009, 2010, 2014, 2019, 2020

Bulgarian Basketball Super Cup : 2

 2018, 2019

Double : 5

 1979, 1982, 1993, 2001, 2014

Treble : 1

 2014

Balkan League : 3

 Winners : 2010, 2014, 2018

Women

Bulgarian Champions : 8

 1980, 1983, 1984, 1985, 1986, 1987, 1988, 1994

Bulgarian Cup : 13

 1969, 1972, 1974, 1976, 1977, 1980, 1982, 1983, 1985, 1986, 1987, 1989, 1991

Double : 5

 1980, 1983, 1985, 1986, 1987

EuroLeague

 Winners : 1984

Ronchetti Cup / EuroCup

 Winners : 1978, 1979
 Runners-Up : 1975

Volleyball

Men

Bulgarian Champions : 15

 1945, 1959, 1980, 1985, 1992, 1997, 1999, 2000, 2001, 2002, 2003, 2004, 2005, 2006, 2009

Bulgarian Cup : 17

 1960, 1966, 1968, 1972, 1980, 1983, 1987, 1989, 1996, 1997, 2000, 2001, 2003, 2004, 2006, 2012, 2014

Double : 7

 1980, 1997, 2000, 2001, 2003, 2004, 2006

CEV Cup Winners' Cup / CEV CupRunners-Up : 61975, 1979, 1982, 1985, 1987, 1989WomenBulgarian Champions : 29 1959, 1961, 1962, 1963, 1964, 1965, 1966, 1967, 1970, 1971, 1972, 1973, 1974, 1975, 1976, 1977, 1980, 1981, 1984, 1990, 1996, 1997, 1998, 1999, 2001, 2002, 2003, 2009, 2014Bulgarian Cup : 27 1959, 1960, 1961, 1966, 1967, 1970, 1972, 1973, 1974, 1978, 1980, 1987, 1990, 1991, 1992, 1994, 1997, 1998, 1999, 2001, 2002, 2003, 2005, 2006, 2009, 2014, 2016Double : 18 1959, 1961, 1966, 1967, 1970, 1972, 1973, 1974, 1980, 1990, 1997, 1998, 1999, 2001, 2002, 2003, 2009, 2014CEV Champions LeagueWinners : 1964Runners-Up : 31975, 1976, 1981HockeyBulgarian Hockey League : 13 1976, 1977, 1978, 1979, 1980, 1981, 1982, 1989, 1990, 1992, 1995, 1999, 2003Bulgarian Cup : 17 1968, 1974, 1977, 1979, 1980, 1982, 1984, 1985, 1988, 1989, 1990, 1991, 1995, 1996, 1999, 2000, 2005Double : 8 1977, 1979, 1980, 1982, 1989, 1990, 1995, 1999

Medals and athletesLevski Sofia athletes''':

Supporters
Levski is the most popular club in Bulgaria. The club has various rivalries in the domestic competitions. Levski fans maintain a friendship with Lazio fans.

European competitions history

See also

 Bulgaria men's national volleyball team
 Bulgaria women's national volleyball team
 Bulgaria men's national basketball team
 Bulgaria women's national basketball team
 Bulgaria national football team
 Bulgaria men's national ice hockey team
 Bulgaria at the Olympics

References

External links
 Official club website

 
Multi-sport clubs in Bulgaria